John George Lynch-Staunton (June 19, 1930 – August 17, 2012) was a Canadian senator, who served as interim leader of the Conservative Party of Canada, from December 2003 to March 2004. He represented the Senate division of Grandville, Quebec.

Early years/education
Born in Montreal, Quebec, Lynch-Staunton was educated at Collège Stanislas and Collège Jean-de-Brébeuf in Montreal. He obtained a B.Sc in Foreign Service from Georgetown University in Washington, D.C. in 1953, and did graduate work towards a Master's Degree in Canadian History at Queen's University, Kingston, Ontario, from 1953 to 1955.

Family
Lynch-Staunton married Juliana de Kuyper in 1958. The couple had five children: Mark (d: 2013), Peter (d: 2015), Gabrielle, Sophie and Sean.
Lynch-Staunton has 9 grandchildren: Caitlin, Harrison, Connor, Juliana, Aidan, Jaryd, Monique, Jack, Matthew and Tyce (b: 2016).

City councillor
Lynch-Staunton was elected to the city council of Montreal in 1960. He represented the district of Côte-des-Neiges and was a member of Mayor Jean Drapeau's Parti civique de Montréal. He was re-elected in 1962, 1966 and 1970. Mayor Drapeau appointed him to the executive committee as vice chairman. In 1974 he lost his bid for re-election to Nick Auf der Maur as the Rassemblement des citoyens et citoyennes de Montréal (RCM) achieved its first political breakthrough.

Provincial politics
Lynch-Staunton ran as a Union Nationale candidate for a provincial by-election in the district of Notre-Dame-de-Grâce in 1968.  He was defeated by Liberal candidate William Tetley.

Senator
Lynch-Staunton was appointed to the Senate on the recommendation of Prime Minister Brian Mulroney on September 23, 1990. The following year, he was appointed Deputy Leader of the Government in the Senate, and he became Leader of the Opposition in the Senate in December 1993 following the Liberal victory in that year's general election. From December 8, 2003, with the merger of the Canadian Alliance and the Progressive Conservative Party of Canada ratified by both parties, he served as interim leader of the new Conservative Party of Canada until the election of Stephen Harper in March 2004. "Lynch-Staunton's high-road leadership of a Senate majority in opposition to an elected majority government in the Commons is a model for students of Parliament – and for future reference when history repeats itself". He remained Leader of the Opposition in the Senate until September 30, 2004, and retired from Parliament when he reached the mandatory retirement age of 75 on June 19, 2005.

Retirement
Lynch-Staunton won a council seat in Stanstead in the Quebec municipal elections on November 1, 2009.

Death
Lynch-Staunton died on August 17, 2012, following a heart attack while he was at a family reunion in Pincher Creek, Alberta; he was 82 years old.

References

External links
 

1930 births
2012 deaths
Canadian senators from Quebec
Collège Stanislas de Paris alumni
Conservative Party of Canada senators
Walsh School of Foreign Service alumni
Leaders of the Conservative Party of Canada
Montreal city councillors
Progressive Conservative Party of Canada senators
Anglophone Quebec people
Georgetown University alumni
Queen's University at Kingston alumni
Quebec people of Irish descent
21st-century Canadian politicians